Penicillium sterculiniicola is a species of fungus in the genus Penicillium which was isolated from spawn run compost in the United States.

References

sterculiniicola
Fungi described in 2014